Bathippus is a genus of jumping spiders.

This genus is very similar to the genus Canama.

Members of this genus are distributed throughout the Australasian region.

The genus name is derived from Βάθιππος, a Greek name.

Description
Females are 6 to 9 mm long, males up to 10 mm. Bathippus is a colorful, long-legged genus, with long, thin bodies. The males have long, robust, forward-pointing chelicerae. The colors differ between species, but the carapace is in most species orange, sometimes with lighter stripes. The opisthosoma is grey, sometimes with three or four pairs of dark grey marks. The legs are orange, with the latter two pairs lighter than those in front.

Habits
Bathippus species are often found wandering about on shrubs in rain forests or their vicinity.

Species
 Bathippus birmanicus Thorell, 1895 – Myanmar
 Bathippus brocchus (Thorell, 1881) – New Guinea
 Bathippus dentiferellus Strand, 1911 – Aru Islands
 Bathippus digitalis Zhang, Song & Li, 2003 – Singapore
 Bathippus dilanians (Thorell, 1881) – New Guinea, Aru Islands
 Bathippus elaphus (Thorell, 1881) – New Guinea
 Bathippus keyensis Strand, 1911 – Kei Islands
 Bathippus kochi (Simon, 1903) – Moluccas
 Bathippus latericius (Thorell, 1881) – New Guinea
 Bathippus macilentus Thorell, 1890 – Sumatra
 Bathippus macrognathus (Thorell, 1881) – New Guinea
 Bathippus macroprotopus Pocock, 1898 – Solomon Islands
 Bathippus manicatus Simon, 1902 – Borneo
 Bathippus molossus (Thorell, 1881) – New Guinea
 Bathippus montrouzieri (Lucas, 1869) – Queensland, New Caledonia
 Bathippus morsitans Pocock, 1897 – Borneo
 Bathippus oedonychus (Thorell, 1881) – New Guinea
 Bathippus oscitans (Thorell, 1881) – New Guinea
 Bathippus pahang Zhang, Song & Li, 2003 – Malaysia
 Bathippus palabuanensis Simon, 1902 – Java
 Bathippus papuanus (Thorell, 1881) – New Guinea, Solomon Islands
 Bathippus proboscideus Pocock, 1899 – New Guinea
 Bathippus rechingeri Kulczynski, 1910 – Solomon Islands
 Bathippus rectus Zhang, Song & Li, 2003 – Singapore
 Bathippus ringens (Thorell, 1881) – New Guinea
 Bathippus schalleri Simon, 1902 – Malaysia
 Bathippus sedatus Peckham & Peckham, 1907 – Borneo
 Bathippus seltuttensis Strand, 1911 – Aru Islands
 Bathippus shelfordi Peckham & Peckham, 1907 – Borneo
 Bathippus waoranus Strand, 1911 – Kei Islands

Footnotes

References
  (2000): An Introduction to the Spiders of South East Asia. Malaysian Nature Society, Kuala Lumpur.
  (2003): Six new and one newly recorded species of Salticidae (Arachnida: Araneae) from Singapore and Malaysia. The Raffles Bulletin of Zoology 51 (2): 187-195. PDF (B. digitalis, B. pahang, B. rectus)
  (2007): The World Spider Catalog, version 8.0. American Museum of Natural History.

External links

 Salticidae.org: Diagnostic drawings and photographs

Further reading

 : 1892: Studi sui ragni Malesi e Papuani. IV, 2. Ann. Mus. civ. stor. nat. Genova 31: 1–490. p. 401

Salticidae
Spiders of Asia
Taxa named by Tamerlan Thorell
Salticidae genera